Shackled is a 2012 Indonesian horror film directed by Upi Avianto. The film is set in Jakarta and involves Elang (Abimana Aryasatya) who has nightmares about an unknown woman in a car with a man in a rabbit suit and dead bodies in the back. Elang later sees this woman in a bar and explains that she's been evicted from her apartment. Elang's nightmares grow worse after he is told by the woman that men had raped and tortured her. Elang agrees to accompany her to face them.

Belenggu had its premiere at the Bucheon International Fantastic Film Festival where it was shown in competition on July 20, 2012.

Cast
 Abimana Aryasatya as Elang
 Imelda Therinne as Jingga
 Laudya Cynthia Bella as Djenar
 Verdi Solaiman as Guntur, Djenar's husband
 Avrilla as Senja, the daughter of Djenar and Guntur
 Jajang C. Noer as Mrs. Kebaya, who had a daughter who died from an accident
 Bella Esperance as The crazy grandmother
 Arswendi Nasution as Josef
 Teuku Rifnu Wikana as The colleague

Reception
Belenggu received a mixed review from Film Business Asia, who stated that "on a psycho-horror level there's nothing new or inventive here. Belenggu isn't bad, it's merely routine". Twitch gave the film a mixed review, opining that "With a tighter, more adventurous script, there is no doubt that Upi Avianto has the talents behind the camera to deliver an effective thriller of great beauty and dramatic substance. While Belenggu is not that film, it nevertheless makes a confident positive stride towards accomplishing that in the future." Variety gave the film a generally positive review, noting that "Though Elang's backstory is a little too sketchy for a little too long, Avianto's imaginative storytelling and the pic's unsettling visual and aural atmosphere should keep most auds absorbed until the triple-reverse finale."

Awards and nominations

References

External Link

2012 horror films
Indonesian horror films
Indonesian horror thriller films
2012 films
Maya Award winners
Citra Award winners